The 3 '''arrondissements of the Pyrénées-Orientales department are:
 Arrondissement of Céret, (subprefecture: Céret) with 64 communes.  The population of the arrondissement was 129,464 in 2016.  
 Arrondissement of Perpignan, (prefecture of the Pyrénées-Orientales department: Perpignan) with 39 communes.  The population of the arrondissement was 285,077 in 2016.  
 Arrondissement of Prades, (subprefecture: Prades) with 123 communes.  The population of the arrondissement was 59,828 in 2016.

History

In 1800 the arrondissements of Perpignan, Céret and Prades were established. All of them was never disbanded.

The borders of the arrondissements of Pyrénées-Orientales were modified in January 2017:
 24 communes from the arrondissement of Perpignan to the arrondissement of Céret
 23 communes from the arrondissement of Perpignan to the arrondissement of Prades

References

Pyrenees-Orientales